Craigdarroch Castle in Victoria, British Columbia, Canada, is a historic, Victorian-era Scottish Baronial mansion. It was designated a National Historic Site of Canada due to its landmark status in Victoria.

History
It was constructed in the late 19th century as a family residence for the wealthy coal baron Robert Dunsmuir and his wife Joan. Robert died in April 1889, 17 months before construction on the castle was completed. His sons Alexander and James took over the role of finishing the home after his death. James also commissioned the construction of Victoria's second "castle": Hatley Castle located in Colwood, British Columbia.

Upon the death of Robert Dunsmuir's widow, Joan, the Craigdarroch estate was sold to land speculator Griffith Hughes for $38,000 who subdivided the estate into building lots. To stimulate sales during a slow real estate market, Griffiths announced that the home would be the subject of a raffle, to be won by one of the purchasers of the residential parcels carved from the estate.  The winner, Solomon Cameron, mortgaged the home to finance other speculative ventures which failed, leaving him broke, and in 1919 ownership of the home passed to one of Cameron's creditors, the Bank of Montreal.

The building later served as a military hospital, college, offices, and a conservatory, before it was re-purposed into a historical museum in 1979. The museum is currently owned by the Craigdarroch Castle Historical Museum Society, which is a private non-profit society, and is open to the public. The building is a tourist attraction, and receives 150,000 visitors a year.

The building was designated as a National Historic Site of Canada in 1992.

Since its completion in 1890, the building had six major occupants, including:

 The Dunsmuirs (1890–1908)
 Military Hospital (1919–1921)
 Victoria College (1921–1946)
 Victoria School Board Office (1946–1968)
 Victoria Conservatory of Music (1969–1979)
 Craigdarroch Castle museum (1979–Present)

Architecture
Craigdarroch Castle is believed to have cost as much as $500,000 when it was built, and included granite from British Columbia, tile from San Francisco, and an oak staircase prefabricated in Chicago. When originally constructed Craigdarroch stood in grounds comprising  of formal gardens in Victoria's Rockland neighbourhood.

The four-story Craigdarroch Castle still has lavish furnishings from the 1890s and is known for its stained-glass and intricate woodwork. The Institute for Stained Glass in Canada has documented the stained glass at Craigdarroch Castle.

The initial architect of the castle, Warren Heywood Williams, also died before completion of the home. His work was taken over by his associate, Arthur L. Smith, in 1890.

See also
 List of historic places in Victoria, British Columbia

References

External links

 

Heritage sites in British Columbia
History of Victoria, British Columbia
Castles in Canada
National Historic Sites in British Columbia
Scottish baronial architecture
Museums in Victoria, British Columbia
Historic house museums in British Columbia
Houses in British Columbia